6-8 Argyle Place, Millers Point is a heritage-listed residential accommodation and commercial building located at 6-8 Argyle Place, in the inner city Sydney suburb of Millers Point in the City of Sydney local government area of New South Wales, Australia. The property was added to the New South Wales State Heritage Register on 2 April 1999.

History 
Millers Point is one of the earliest areas of European settlement in Australia, and a focus for maritime activities. Argyle Place, a primitive version of a London Square, was commenced by Governor Macquarie but not fully formed until after quarrying of the adjacent rock face had ceased in about 1865. A significant streetscape element, this Edwardian commercial/residential group mostly intact, forms an interesting corner at the end of Argyle Place. First tenanted by the NSW Department of Housing in 1986.

Description 
One of a row of terraces, commercial on ground floor with residential space over. Built  in the Federation style, important streetscape element. Storeys: Two; Construction: Face brick and rendered masonry walls with slate roof. Painted timber joinery and trim. Style: Edwardian Orientation: Overlooking Argyle Place.

The external condition of the property is good.

Modifications and dates 
External: Shop fronts altered, windows altered, verandahs infilled, brick work painted, services added. - Last inspected: 19/02/95

Heritage listing 
As at 23 November 2000, this building is one of a group of five post-plague Edwardian commercial and residential properties, which are very important to the streetscape of Millers Point.

It is part of the Millers Point Conservation Area, an intact residential and maritime precinct. It contains residential buildings and civic spaces dating from the 1830s and is an important example of C19th adaptation of the landscape.

6-8 Argyle Place, Millers Point was listed on the New South Wales State Heritage Register on 2 April 1999.

See also 

Australian residential architectural styles
10-12a Argyle Place, Millers Point

References

Bibliography

Attribution

External links

 

New South Wales State Heritage Register sites located in Millers Point
Commercial buildings in New South Wales
Houses in Millers Point, New South Wales
Retail buildings in New South Wales
Articles incorporating text from the New South Wales State Heritage Register
1906 establishments in Australia
Commercial buildings completed in 1906
Millers Point Conservation Area
Federation style architecture
Edwardian architecture in Australia